The Toronto Varsity Blues football team represents the University of Toronto in the sport of Canadian football in U Sports. Dating back to 1877, the Toronto Varsity Blues football program initially competed for the Canadian Dominion Football Championship and won six national titles, including the first Grey Cup game ever held in 1909, as well as winning in 1895, 1905, 1910, 1911, and 1920. After intercollegiate teams no longer competed for the Dominion Championship, the team won the first Vanier Cup ever held in 1965, and then again in 1993 as Canadian national football champions. The team has 25 Yates Cup championship wins as champions of the Ontario University Athletics conference of the U Sports, a total second only to the 31 won by the Western Ontario Mustangs.

Recent history
Hard times have fallen on the University of Toronto football team in recent years. The football program had not won a game since the 2001 season (a win that itself ended an 18-game losing streak). On October 13, 2007, they set the record for the longest losing streak in Canadian university history, at 49 losses in a row. This losing streak was snapped on September 1, 2008 when they defeated the Waterloo Warriors 18-17 for their first win in almost seven years. The team last posted a winning record in 1995.

The team was led by head coach Greg DeLaval who won his first game with the Blues when the team ended their record-setting losing streak in 2008. In 2010, the Blues posted a remarkable 40-35 win over the second-ranked Ottawa Gee-Gees, which was their first win over a nationally ranked opponent since 1997 against the Waterloo Warriors. The Blues finished with a 3-5 record in 2010, which was their best since the 1996 season when they posted the same mark. The Blues hired Greg Gary as head coach in 2011, and finished with another 3-5 record, once again finishing just out of the playoffs in seventh place. The team took a step back with a 2-6 record in 2012, including home losses to fellow 2-6 teams York and Ottawa. However, in 2013, they finished the season 4-4, the first time since 1993, but failed to make the playoffs. The team again regressed in 2014 with a 2-6 record, but rebounded in 2015 with a slightly improved 3-5 record. The program again failed to gain any momentum and won only two games the following season and then only one game in 2017 along with a last place finish. Gary resigned as head coach following the season's end and Greg Marshall was hired as his replacement. Marshall finished with a winless record in his first year, but the team showed progress in his second season where they finished with a 2-6 record. The Varsity Blues qualified for the playoffs in 2021 for the first time since 1995 and hosted a playoff game for the first time since 1992. In 2022, the Varsity Blues finished in seventh place with a 4-4 record and again qualified for the playoffs as the OUA expanded the number of playoff teams.

Season-by-season record

The following is the record of the Toronto Varsity Blues football team since 2000:

Head coaches

National award winners
Hec Crighton Trophy: Mike Eben (1967), Mike Raham (1968), Dan Feraday (1981), Eugene Buccigrossi (1992)
J. P. Metras Trophy: Chris Morris (1990)
Presidents' Trophy: Lou Tiro (1993)
Russ Jackson Award: David Hamilton (2008)
Frank Tindall Trophy: Ron Murphy (1974)

Varsity Blues in the CFL

As of the end of the 2022 CFL season, three former Varsity Blues players were on CFL teams' rosters:

Albert Awachie, Saskatchewan Roughriders
Nick Hallett, Winnipeg Blue Bombers
Llevi Noel, Edmonton Elks

References

External links
 

 
Sports clubs established in 1877
1877 establishments in Ontario